Ferdi Erenay Kadıoğlu (born 7 October 1999) is a professional footballer who plays as a midfielder or winger for Fenerbahçe in the Süper Lig. Born in the Netherlands, Kadıoğlu plays for the Turkey national team.

Club career

NEC
Kadıoğlu spent his early years with NEC in the Dutch Eerste Divisie.

Fenerbahçe

2018-19
In July 2018, Kadıoğlu signed for Turkish Süper Lig club Fenerbahçe under Phillip Cocu, famous Dutch football manager of the club at the time. In his first season, he played mostly in Fenerbahçe U21 team and made his debut for the senior squad on December 20, 2018, coming off the bench in a Turkish Cup match against Giresunspor. He also played 11 matches with Fenerbahçe U21 in U21 Ligi.

2019-20
In following season he started to find more time in the senior squad and scored his first goal for Fenerbahçe on August 19, 2019 against Gaziantep, netting the final goal in a 5-0 victory.

2020-21
On his third season, after the signing of Erol Bulut, the new football manager for the club, he started to find more time in first team than in his first two seasons and became one of the key players who took more responsibility on the field.

2021-22
The following year as managers changed, under Vitor Pereira and İsmail Kartal respectively, he retained and solidified his place in the squad. Despite his young age, he was getting more full 90 minutes. On March 17, 2022, Fenerbahçe announced to sign a four year contract with Ferdi Kadıoğlu.

International career
Kadıoğlu was born in the Netherlands to a Turkish father and a Dutch Canadians mother. He is therefore eligible to represent Turkey, the Netherlands and Canada internationally. He was a youth international for the Netherlands. 

In March 2021 Kadıoğlu was named to the Netherlands U-21 squad for that year's UEFA European Under-21 Championship. Later that year in November 2021 Turkey coach Stefan Kuntz revealed that he was expecting Kadıoğlu to make his decision on his international future in March 2022.

On 3 January 2022 his club Fenerbahçe announced that he chose to represent the Turkey national football team. He debuted with Turkey in a 4–0 UEFA Nations League win over Faroe Islands on 4 June 2022.

Career statistics

Club

International

References

External links
 

 

1999 births
Living people
Citizens of Turkey through descent
Turkish people of Dutch descent
Turkish people of Canadian descent
Dutch people of Canadian descent
Dutch people of Turkish descent
Canadian people of Dutch descent
Canadian people of Turkish descent
Footballers from Arnhem
Association football forwards
Turkish footballers
Turkey international footballers
Dutch footballers
Netherlands under-21 international footballers
Netherlands youth international footballers
NEC Nijmegen players
Fenerbahçe S.K. footballers
Eredivisie players
Eerste Divisie players
Süper Lig players